The women's competition in the –75 kg division was held on 25 October 2013 in Centennial Hall, Wrocław, Poland.

Schedule

Medalists

Records

Results

References

Results 
Results

2013 World Weightlifting Championships
World